is the sixth-largest city in Japan, the second-largest port city after Yokohama, and the capital city of Fukuoka Prefecture, Japan. The city is built along the shores of Hakata Bay, and has been a center of international commerce since ancient times. The area has long been considered the gateway to the country, as it is the nearest point among Japan's main islands to the Asian mainland. Although humans occupied the area since the Jomon period, some of the earliest settlers of the Yayoi period arrived in the Fukuoka area.  The city rose to prominence during the Yamato period. Because of the cross-cultural exposure, and the relatively great distance from the social and political centers of Kyoto, Osaka, and later, Edo (Tokyo), Fukuoka gained a distinctive local culture and dialect that has persisted to the present.

Fukuoka is the most populous city on Kyūshū island, followed by Kitakyushu. It is the largest city and metropolitan area west of Keihanshin. The city was designated by government ordinance on April 1, 1972. Greater Fukuoka, with a population of 2.5 million people (2005 census), is part of the heavily industrialized Fukuoka–Kitakyushu zone.

, Fukuoka is Japan's sixth largest city, having passed the population of Kobe. In July 2011, Fukuoka surpassed the population of Kyoto. Since the founding of Kyoto in 794, this marks the first time that a city west of the Kansai region has a larger population than Kyoto.

History

Early history
Exchanges from the continent and the Northern Kyushu area date as far back as Old Stone Age. It has been thought that waves of immigrants arrived in Northern Kyushu from mainland Asia. Several Kofun exist.

Dazaifu was an administrative capital in 663 A.D., and it has been suggested that a prehistoric capital was in the area. Ancient texts, such as the Kojiki, Kanyen (found in Dazaifu) and archaeology confirm this was a critical place in the founding of Japan. Some scholars claim that it was the first place outsiders and the Imperial Family set foot, but like many early Japan origin theories, it remains contested. Central Fukuoka is sometimes still referred as Hakata which is the name of the central ward.

In addition, remains of the Kōrokan (Government Guest House) were found in Fukuoka underneath a part of the ruins of Fukuoka Castle.

In 923, the Hakozaki Shrine in Fukuoka was established when the god Hachiman was transferred from the Daibu shrine in Honami.

Mongol invasions (1274–1281)

Kublai Khan of the Mongol Empire turned his attention towards Japan starting in 1268, exerting a new external pressure on Japan with which it had no experience. Kublai Khan first sent an envoy to Japan to make the Shogunate acknowledge Khan's suzerainty. The Kamakura shogunate refused. Mongolia repeatedly sent envoys thereafter, each time urging the Shogunate to accept their proposal, but to no avail.

In 1274, Kublai Khan mounted an invasion of the northern part of Kyushu with a fleet of 900 ships and 33,000 troops, including troops from Goryeo on the Korean Peninsula. This initial invasion was compromised by a combination of incompetence and severe storms. After the invasion attempt of 1274, Japanese samurai built a stone barrier  in length bordering the coast of Hakata Bay in what is now the city of Fukuoka. The wall, 2–3 metres in height and having a base width of 3 metres, was constructed between 1276 and 1277, and was excavated in the 1930s.

Kublai sent another envoy to Japan in 1279. At that time, Hōjō Tokimune of the Hōjō clan (1251–1284) was the Eighth Regent. Not only did he decline the offer, but he beheaded the five Mongolian emissaries after summoning them to Kamakura. Infuriated, Kublai organized another attack on Fukuoka Prefecture in 1281, mobilizing 140,000 soldiers and 4,000 ships. However, the Japanese were again aided by severe weather, this time by a typhoon that struck a crushing blow to the Mongolian troops, thwarting the invasion.

It was this typhoon that came to be called the Kamikaze (Divine Wind), and was the origin of the term Kamikaze used to indicate suicide attacks by military aviators of the Empire of Japan against Allied naval vessels during World War II.

Formation of the modern city (1889)
Fukuoka was formerly the residence of the powerful daimyō of Chikuzen Province, and played an important part in the medieval history of Japan. The renowned temple of Tokugawa Ieyasu in the district was destroyed by fire during the Boshin War of 1868. 

The modern city was formed on April 1, 1889, with the merger of the former cities of Hakata and Fukuoka. Historically, Hakata was the port and merchant district, and was more associated with the area's culture and remains the main commercial area today. On the other hand, the Fukuoka area was home to many samurai, and its name has been used since Kuroda Nagamasa, the first daimyō of Chikuzen Province, named it after his birthplace in Okayama Prefecture and the "old Fukuoka" is the main shopping area, now called Tenjin.

When Hakata and Fukuoka decided to merge, a meeting was held to decide the name for the new city. Hakata was initially chosen, but a group of samurai crashed the meeting and forced those present to choose Fukuoka as the name for the merged city. However, Hakata is still used to refer to the Hakata area of the city and, most famously, to refer to the city's train station, Hakata Station, and dialect, Hakata-ben.

20th century
 1903: Fukuoka Medical College, a campus associated with Kyoto Imperial University, is founded. In 1911, the college is renamed Kyushu Imperial University and established as a separate entity.
 1910: Fukuoka streetcar service begins. (The service ran until 1979.)
 1929: Flights commence along the Fukuoka-Osaka-Tokyo route.
 1945: Fukuoka was firebombed on June 19, with the attack destroying 21.5 percent of the city's urban area.
 1947: First Fukuoka Marathon.
 1951: Fukuoka airport opens.
 1953: Fukuoka Zoo opens.
 1975: The city absorbed the town of Sawara.
 1975: Sanyō Shinkansen high-speed railway reaches Hakata station.
 1981: Subway commences service.
 1988: Osaka's pro baseball team, the Nankai Hawks, was moved to Fukuoka and renamed the Fukuoka Daiei Hawks (renamed the Fukuoka SoftBank Hawks in 2004).
 1989: Asian-Pacific Exposition is held.
 1997: The 30th annual meeting of the Asian Development Bank was held in Fukuoka.

21st century
 2005: Fukuoka subway Nanakuma Line started operations.
 2014: Selected as the National Strategic Zone for "global startups & job creation" by Japanese government.

Geography

Fukuoka is bordered on three sides by mountains, surrounds Hakata Bay and opens on the north to the Genkai Sea.

The nearest overseas region is Busan Metropolitan City in Gyeongsang-do, South Korea, and the distance from Busan is about 180 km (112 miles). Fukuoka and Busan are sister cities.

Climate
Fukuoka has a humid subtropical climate (Köppen: Cfa), hot and humid summers, and relatively mild winters.

Roughly 40% of the year is cloudy.

Winter temperatures rarely drop below  and it rarely snows, though light rain does fall on most days if not as consistently as on the Sea of Japan side of Honshu. Spring is warm and sunnier, with cherry blossoms appearing in late March or early April. Autumn, often considered to be Fukuoka's best season, is mild and dry, though the typhoon season runs between August and September.

Disaster

Earthquakes

Fukuoka is not as seismically active as many other parts of Japan, but does experience occasional earthquakes. The most powerful recent earthquake registered a lower 6 of maximum 7 of the Japanese intensity scale and hit at 10:53 am local time on March 20, 2005, killing one person and injuring more than 400. The epicentre of the earthquake was in the Genkai Sea along a yet-undiscovered extension of the Kego fault that runs through the centre of Fukuoka. Genkai island, a part of Nishi-ku, was the most severely damaged by the earthquake and almost all island residents were forced to evacuate. Aftershocks continued intermittently throughout the following weeks as construction crews worked to rebuild damaged buildings throughout the city. Traditional Japanese houses, particularly in the areas of Daimyo and Imaizumi, were the most heavily damaged and many were marked for demolition, along with several apartment buildings. Insurance payments for damages were estimated at approximately 15.8 billion yen.

A similar quake, with an intensity of 5+, also occurred one month later on April 20, 2005.

It is estimated to produce earthquakes as strong as magnitude 7 at the focus approximately once every 15,000 years. The probability of an earthquake along the known length of the Kego fault occurring within 30 years was estimated at 0.4% prior to the March 20, 2005 earthquake, but this probability has been revised upwards since.

Following reports that the city has only prepared for earthquakes up to a magnitude of 6.5, several strong aftershocks renewed fears that the quakes might cause the portion of the Kego fault that lies under the city to become active again, leading to an earthquake as big as, or bigger than, the March 20 quake.

Wards
Fukuoka has 7 wards (ku).

Cityscape

Demographics

Fukuoka is Japan's youngest major city and has Japan's fastest growing population. Between December 2012 and December 2017, the proportion of foreign-born residents increased faster than any other major city in Japan, including Tokyo.

There were 171 homeless residents counted in 2018's annual survey, down from a high of 969 in 2009.

As of March 2023, Fukuoka had a population of 1,632,713 with 770,276 males and 862,437 females.

Economy

Fukuoka is the economic center of the Kyushu region, with an economy largely focused on the service sector. It is also the largest startup city in Japan, and is the only economic zone for startups. They have various services for startups like startup visa, tax reduction, and free business consultations. Fukuoka has the highest business-opening rate in Japan. Large companies headquartered in the city include Iwataya and Kyushu Electric Power. Fukuoka is also the home of many small firms playing a supportive role in the logistics, IT, and high-tech manufacturing sectors. Most of the region's heavy manufacturing takes place in the nearby city of Kitakyushu.

The GDP in Greater Fukuoka, Fukuoka Metropolitan Employment Area, was US$101.6 billion in 2010. Fukuoka is the primary economic center of the Fukuoka-Kitakyushu metropolitan area, which is the 4th largest economy in Japan. As of 2014, the area's PPP-adjusted GDP is estimated to be larger than those of metropolitan areas such as Melbourne, Kuala Lumpur, Lima, Vienna, Barcelona and Rome.

Several regional broadcasters are based in the city, including Fukuoka Broadcasting Corporation, Kyushu Asahi Broadcasting, Love FM, RKB Mainichi Broadcasting, and Television Nishinippon Corporation.

The port of Hakata and Fukuoka Airport also make the city a key regional transportation hub. Fukuoka houses the headquarters of Kyushu Railway Company (JR Kyushu) and Nishi-Nippon Railroad. Air Next, a subsidiary of All Nippon Airways, is headquartered in Hakata-ku; prior to its dissolution, Harlequin Air was also headquartered in Hakata-ku.

Fukuoka has its own stock exchange, founded in 1949. It is one of six in Japan.

Fukuoka is one of the most affordable cities in Japan.

Culture

Fukuoka was selected as one of Newsweeks 10 "Most Dynamic Cities" in its July 2006 issue. It was chosen for its central Asian location, increasing tourism and trade, and a large increase in volume at its sea and airport. Fukuoka has a diverse culture and a wide range of cultural attractions.

In its July/August 2008 issue, Monocle selected Fukuoka as number 17 of the "Top 25 liveable cities". It was chosen for excellent shopping, outstanding food, good transport links, good museums, "a feeling of openness in its sea air", green spaces and because it is friendly, safe, clean and close to the rest of East Asia. The same survey in 2018 ranked Fukuoka at number 22.

ACROS (Asian Cross Road Over the Sea) is a cultural center located at the Tenjin Central Park. Part of it is the Fukuoka Symphony Hall and it hosts several other cultural events in a green building.

The Fukuoka Asian Culture Prize was established to honor the outstanding work of individuals or organizations in Asia.

Tourism

Fukuoka hosts more than 2 million foreign visitors annually, with the majority coming from neighboring South Korea, Taiwan and China. From the early 2010s Hakata became the beneficiary of significant growth in cruise ship tourism; particularly with visitors from China. After expansion and redevelopment of the Hakata Port international passenger ship terminal, the number of cruise ship port calls in 2016 was expected to exceed 400.

Nearly ten thousand international students attend universities in or near the Fukuoka prefecture each year. Nearly 200 international conferences are held each year in Fukuoka.

Attractions

Fukuoka Castle, located adjacent to Ohori Park in Maizuru Park, features the remaining stone walls and ramparts left after a devastating fire during the upheaval of the Meiji Restoration. It has now been preserved along with some reconstructed prefabricate concrete towers constructed during the 1950s and 1960s, when there was a trend across Japan to rebuild damaged castles as tourist attractions. Ōhori Park is also the location of one of Fukuoka City's major art galleries.

There are many temples with long histories including Tōchō-ji, Hakozaki Shrine, Kashii shrine, and Jōten-ji. The Buddhist Nanzoin temple is located in Sasaguri, just east of Fukuoka. It is claimed to be the largest statue of a reclining Buddha in the world.

Sky Dream Fukuoka, in Fukuoka's western ward, was a Ferris wheel with a height of 120 meters and was closed in September 2009. The surrounding shopping center, Marinoa City Fukuoka, still attracts millions of visitors each year. Other shopping centers that attract tourists include Canal City, JR Hakata City, and Hakata Riverain.

The Marine Park Uminonakamichi is located on a narrow cape on the northern side of the Bay of Hakata. The park has an amusement park, petting zoo, gardens, beaches, a hotel, and a large marine aquarium which opened in 1989.

For tourists from other parts of Japan, local foods such as mentaiko, Hakata (tonkotsu) ramen, and motsunabe are associated with Fukuoka. Yatai (street stalls) serving ramen can be found in Tenjin and Nakasu most evenings.

Fukuoka Tower is near the beach in Seaside Momochi, a development built for the 1989 Asia-Pacific Exhibition. The older symbol of the city, Hakata Port Tower, is next to the international ferry terminal and is free to enter.

Itoshima, to the west of Fukuoka city, has recently become a very popular tourist destination.  There are many beaches along the coast, notably Futamigaura beach, where there is a famous Shinto shrine in the ocean, and Keya beach, which hosts the annual Sunset Live festival every September. Inland, there is the Shingon Buddhist temple called Raizan Sennyoji, where there are many Buddhist statues and stunning autumn foliage.

Museums

 Fukuoka Art Museum – In Ohori Park; contains a wide selection of contemporary and other art from around the world, including works by Mark Rothko, Roy Lichtenstein, and Salvador Dalí.
 Fukuoka Asian Art Museum – contains art from various countries of Asia.
 Fukuoka City Museum – displays a broad range of items from the region's history, including a spectacular gold seal.
 Fukuoka Oriental Ceramics Museum
 Fukuoka Prefectural Museum of Art
 Genko Historical Museum (元寇史料館, Museum of the Mongol Invasion) – In Higashi Koen (Eastern Park); displays Japanese and Mongolian arms and armor from the 13th century as well as paintings on historical subjects. Open on weekends.
 Hakata Machiya Folk Museum – Dedicated to displaying the traditional ways of life, speech, and culture of the Fukuoka region.
 Kyushu National Museum in nearby Dazaifu.

Festivals

Fukuoka is home to many festivals (matsuri) that are held throughout the year. Of these, the most famous are Hakata Dontaku and Hakata Gion Yamakasa.

Yamakasa
, held for two weeks each July, is Fukuoka's oldest festival with a history of over 700 years. The festival dates back to 1241 when a priest called Shioichu Kokushi saved Hakata from a terrible plague by being carried around the city on a movable shrine and throwing water. Teams of men (no women, except small girls, are allowed), representing different districts in the city, commemorate the priest's route by racing against the clock around a set course carrying on their shoulders floats weighing several thousand pounds. Participants all wear shimekomi (called fundoshi in other parts of Japan), which are traditional loincloths.

Each day of the two-week festival is marked by special events and practice runs, culminating in the official race that takes place the last morning before dawn. Tens of thousands line the streets to cheer on the teams. During the festival, men can be seen walking around many parts of Fukuoka in long happi coats bearing the distinctive mark of their team affiliation and traditional geta sandals. The costumes are worn with pride and are considered appropriate wear for even formal occasions, such as weddings and cocktail parties, during the festival.

Hakata Dontaku
 is held in Fukuoka City on May 3 and 4. Boasting over 800 years of history, Dontaku is attended by more than 2 million people, making it the festival with the highest attendance during Japan's Golden Week holidays. During the festival, stages are erected throughout downtown for traditional performances and a parade of floats is held. The full name is Hakata Dontaku Minato Matsuri.

The festival was stopped for seven years during the Meiji era. Since it was restarted in the 12th year of the Meiji era it has been known as Hakata Dontaku.

Music
Notable musical names in J-pop include Ayumi Hamasaki (allegedly Japan's richest woman), hugely popular singer-songwriter duo Chage & Aska, singer-songwriter Eri Nobuchika, Misia, and Yui. During the 1970s, local musicians prided themselves on their origins and dubbed their sound, Mentai Rock.

Morning Musume 6th generation member Reina Tanaka was also born here in 1989 along with 9th generation member Erina Ikuta in 1997.

Dominican songwriter and singer Juan Luis Guerra pays homage to the city in his bachata song Bachata en Fukuoka (2010).

HKT 48 have their own Theater at Nishitetsu Hall.

Ezaki Hikaru of the k-pop group Kep1er was born in Fukuoka.

Transport

Fukuoka is served by Fukuoka Airport, the San'yō Shinkansen and the Kyushu Shinkansen high-speed rail line and other JR Kyushu trains at Hakata Station and by ferry. JR Kyushu and a Korean company operate hydrofoil ferries (named Beetle and Kobee) between Hakata and Busan, South Korea. The city has three subway lines: the Kūkō Line, the Hakozaki Line, and the newest one, Subway Nanakuma Line, opened on February 2, 2005. A private railway line, run by Nishitetsu is also heavily used and connects the downtown area of Tenjin to the city of Ōmuta.

Sports

Fukuoka is the home of the Fukuoka SoftBank Hawks, one of Japan's top professional baseball teams. Threatened with bankruptcy and forced by its creditors to restructure, former owner Daiei sold the Hawks to Softbank Capital in 2004. After the sale to Softbank, the Hawks have become the one of the most successful teams in NPB, winning 6 Japan Series title in 8 years. Their home stadium is the Fukuoka PayPay Dome.

Fukuoka is home to a professional football team, Avispa Fukuoka.

Annual sporting events include:
 The All Japan Judo Category Championships are held in early April.
 The Kyushu ekiden, beginning in Nagasaki and ending in Fukuoka, the world's longest relay race, held in October. (Defunct)
 The November tournament of professional Sumo is held at the Fukuoka Kokusai Center.

Fukuoka has hosted the following sporting events:
 Fukuoka Marathon from 1947 through 2021.
 1983 Asian Volleyball Championship for Women
 1995 Summer Universiade
 1997 Pan Pacific Swimming Championships
 1998 Women's Volleyball World Championship
 1999 Asian Basketball Championship
 2001 World Aquatics Championships.
 2006 IAAF World Cross Country Championships.
 Fukuoka International Women's Judo Championships from 1983 to 2006.
 2013-14 Grand Prix of Figure Skating Final

Sports teams and facilities

Education
Fukuoka City operates all public elementary and junior high schools, while the prefecture operates the high schools.

National universities
 
  – merged with Kyushu University in October 2003

Prefectural university
 

Private universities
 
 
 
 
 
 
 

Colleges
 
 Fukuoka Institute of Technology, Junior college (福岡工業大学短期大学部|Fukuoka Kōgyō Daigaku Tanki Daigakubu)
 
 
 
 
 
 

Catholic schools
 Sophia Fukuoka Junior and Senior High School

International relations
Fukuoka has ten sister cities.

 Atlanta, GA, United States (since February 2005)
 Auckland, New Zealand (since June 1986)
 Bordeaux, Nouvelle-Aquitaine, France (since November 1982)
 Busan, South Korea (since February 2007)
 Delhi, India (since November 2007, friendship city)
 Guangzhou, China (since February 1979)
 Ipoh, Perak, Malaysia (since March 1989)
 Oakland, CA,  United States (since October 1962)
 Naples, Campania, Italy (since October 1983)
 Qingdao, Shandong, China (since February 2003)
 Yangon, Myanmar (since December 2016)

The city established the Asian Pacific City Summit in 1994. It consists of 26 Asia-Pacific cities. The Asian Pacific Children's Convention was established in Fukuoka in 1988.

Notable people
 
 Jirō Akagawa, novelist
 Aska (singer) (Chage and Aska)
 Sonny Chiba, actor, singer, film producer, film director and martial artist
 Kaibara Ekken, Neo-Confucianist philosopher
 Chiya Fujino, writer
 Noriko Fukuda, TV announcer
 Kenji Hamada, voice actor
 Ayumi Hamasaki, J-pop singer
 Angela Harry, model and actress
 Kanna Hashimoto, actress, singer and former idol
 Riko Higashio, professional golfer
 Kiyoshi Hikawa, enka singer
 Kōki Hirota, politician: 32nd Prime Minister of Japan
 HKT48, idol group
 Yōsuke Ideguchi, Footballer for Celtic F.C.
 Hiroe Igeta, model, actress and tarento
 Elaiza Ikeda, model and actress
 Erina Ikuta, J-pop singer and member of Morning Musume
 Mio Imada, actress and model
 Tomo Inouye, medical doctor
 Ryo Ishibashi, actor and musician
 Sui Ishida, manga artist
 Gakuryū Ishii, film director
 Kanikapila, rock band
 Ai Kawashima, singer-songwriter
 Yoshinori Kobayashi, manga artist
 Masamune Kusano, vocalist of Spitz
 Yumeno Kyūsaku, novelist
 Misia, J-pop singer
 Kento Miyahara, professional wrestler
 Yume Miyamoto, actress and voice actress
 Ryutaro Nakahara, DJ, musician, composer and arranger
 Kenzo Nakamura, Judo athlete
 Katsuhiko Nakajima, professional wrestler
 Ai Nonaka, voice actor
 Yukari Oshima, actress
 Victoria Principal, American actress
 Noriko Sakai, singer and actress
 Nao Sakuma, principal dancer with Birmingham Royal Ballet
 Kensuke Sasaki, professional wrestler
 Kohei Uchimura, artistic gymnast
 Sayuri, singer-songwriter
 Kōji Seto, actor
 Eihi Shiina, model and actress
 Ringo Shiina, J-pop singer born in Saitama Prefecture and raised in Fukuoka
 Polkadot Stingray, rock band
 Keita Tachibana, J-pop singer and member of W-inds
 Takehiro Tomiyasu, footballer for Arsenal F.C.
 Akitomo Takeno, basketball player
 Dan Takuma, businessman
 Tamori, TV presenter
 Kane Tanaka, oldest verified Japanese person ever and second oldest verified person ever
 Reina Tanaka, J-pop singer and a member of Morning Musume and Lovendor
 Ryoko Tani, judo athlete
 Rintaro Tokunaga, basketball player
 Misa Uehara (1937–2003), actress
 Ren Kawashiri, J-pop singer/dancer, member of JO1 
 Ryutaro Umeno, baseball player for the Hanshin Tigers
 Masaaki Yuasa, director
 Yui, singer
 Takumi Iroha, Japanese professional wrestler
 Sosuke Ikematsu, movie actor, television actor and theatre actor
 Haruto Watanabe, K-pop Idol, boy group Treasure (band)

See also
2006 Fukuoka mayoral election
List of Places of Scenic Beauty of Japan (Fukuoka)
List of Historic Sites of Japan (Fukuoka)

References

External links

 Fukuoka City official website 
Fukuoka Convention & Visitors Bureau
 Official Tourism Site of Fukuoka City
 Fukuoka Now

 
Cities in Fukuoka Prefecture
Port settlements in Japan
Populated coastal places in Japan
Cities designated by government ordinance of Japan
Populated places with period of establishment missing